Petrosphere (from Greek πέτρα (petra), "stone", and σφαῖρα (sphaira), "ball") may refer to:

 Stone balls, a diverse class of archaeological artefact
 Particularly carved stone balls, prehistoric artefacts found in the British Isles
 Petrosphere (geology), a planet's crust and mantle